Vidyodaya School is a private college-preparatory combined-grades school located in Thevakkal, Kochi, India. It provides comprehensive school education from lower primary to grade 12.

About
Established in 1990-91 the school conducts classes from LKG to Grade 12. The 12 acre  campus situated on a hillock comprises the Nursery block, the Primary, Secondary, and Science blocks. The school has a strength of 2057 students.

The campus has science, mathematics, and computer labs, and a conference hall. The Administrative block accommodates a library, reading room, and canteen. Other infrastructural facilities include the Sports Complex with basketball, volleyball, football, and hockey courts, a roller-skating rink, and cricket pitches. 15 buses ply the city and suburbs, facilitating the transportation of students and staff.

Academics
Vidyodaya School follows the CBSE Scheme. The medium of instruction is English. Hindi / Malayalam is introduced as the second language from first grade and Malayalam / Sanskrit is introduced as the third language from third grade. At Senior Secondary stage, there are two groups-Science and Commerce. English is a compulsory subject in all the three groups.Classes VI to X follow NCERT text books in major subjects. Till tenth standard students are exposed to range of subjects which include science, languages, mathematics, social sciences, yoga, physical education, art and crafts, etc after which students can choose their preferred specializations.
Admissions are given restricting the number of students to 30 in each class.

Curriculum
The school's academic program is based on the Central Board of Secondary Education (CBSE), New Delhi and the text books are as prescribed by the National Council of Educational Research and Training (NCERT).

Sports and cultural activities
In extra-curricular activities, students have topped competitions at District, State and National Championships. Of particular note are the judo and wrestling teams which have won several National Championships.

Every year the school hosts a big stage for inter-school cultural competitions called Vox( the voice) with usually value based themes.

Dramatics
The School Dramatics Club has conducted programs such as Thattakam Tree Weekly Drama and the Annual Dramatics Show, and is very active, both inside and outside the school. The Dramatics club regularly showcases dramas and plays in various places.

Nursery Block
The Nursery Block, containing the Kindergarten, is situated at the bottom of the hillock, near the campus entrance. It is in a figurative art-deco architectural style. Shaped in the form of a train station, with a train on one side, the surrounding garden and park are complementary to the concept, by including references to public transportation such as models of traffic lights and buses.The building includes a Swimming Pool, Activities Stage, and classrooms. A notable feature is the murals on the walls.

Primary and Secondary Section
The Primary and Secondary Section has multiple blocks spread over the campus. The class strength is restricted to a maximum of 30 students and there are 5 divisions in each grade.

Senior Secondary Block
The Senior Secondary Block, also called the Science Block, due to the Science Laboratories being located within, is situated on the north-west side of the hillock. Architecture within and around the building also allude to the popular moniker, such as a giant turtle shaped pool, dinosaurs painted on the walls, and a model science park. Grades 11-12 are located here.

Additional Facilities
There are Chemistry, Physics, Biology, Computer Science and Mathematics Laboratories spread throughout the campus. Other facilities include SMART Classes(Virtual Classrooms), multiple conference halls, and open-air classrooms spread around the campus...

School transportation
The school transportation facilities include a school bus system of over a dozen school buses which ply the different suburbs of the city, including a private bus terminus on the campus. There are private vehicles operating to and from the school. The school is located near bus-stops, providing access to the city.

Student activities
Student activities include a Student Government framework, Student Houses, clubs, groups, and events. Activities include flower making, paper craft, clay modelling, tie and dye work, metal work, scientific awareness, and nutrition.

Cultural celebrations include Onam, Christmas, Ramayana month, Navrathri, and Ramzan.

The students social awareness is enhanced by the observance of World Environment Day, Constitution Day, Human Rights Day, and Science Day. Their patriotism and reverence for India's traditional values are reinforced through community singing, skits, and plays. Arts and Crafts, Science, and other exhibitions are a feature of the school. Programs are also held to improve awareness of Energy conservation and water consumption.

School Parliamentary Forum
School Parliamentary Forum is the name of the Vidyodaya School Student Government. Modeled around the Indian Parliament, students from each class are selected to the Forum, and divided into different circles for different activities. Each circle is headed by a Minister, who reports to the Speaker or Deputy Speaker, both of whom are elected by the Forum.

Another post includes the Forum Secretary who is elected and notes down the proceedings. The head of the Forum are the Head Boys and Head Girls, who are directly elected by the students in an annual election during the month of July. House Captains are members of the Forum of the same status as the Speaker.

Houses
The school students are divided into four houses- Ezhuthachan, Kabir, Tagore and Valmiki, each with their respective colors and teams. They engage in inter-house competitions spread over the year to get points which culminates in the awarding of the House Cup to the House with the most points. Intra school competitions in craft, painting, dance and music, literary histrionic skills, sports and games are held between the houses to inculcate a competitive spirit between the children.

Clubs
The school offers children a wide variety of clubs to choose from. The most prominent clubs are Quiz Club, Sports/Agriculture Club and Dramatics Club. Other clubs include Literary, Art and Craft, Maths, Science and Space. Enough time is allocated for club activities and each club is mentored by teachers.

Y!
There is a school chapter of the CII Promoted Young Indians, which functions as a club. The club seeks to inspire leadership qualities among the students. It is one of the most prominent clubs of the school.

Junior Red Cross
A chapter of the Junior Red Cross which functions in the school. Members wear white clothing with red stripes every Wednesday. The club seeks to promote education of First Aid among the students.

Shanti Samithi
The social service activities club seeks to promote the values of Gandhiism, peace and nonviolence among the students. It holds annual activities and conducts programs to help the poor in the surrounding areas.

Events

VINS

Sarganjali
A programme for the students, by the students. The students of each division have to perform a drama,a song, a dance and a special programme, all within 20 minutes.[The program is conducted every year by the students of each class under 9th grade , with the grade below being their audience.

Vox Populi
Vox Populi (Latin for Voice Of The People) is a stage for Interschool Competitions, wherein senior students get the opportunity to develop their organizing skills. The competition is one of the most prominent in the city, attracting companies and students.

Inter-School Camp
The Vidyodaya Inter-School Camp is a three day camp that the school hosts and is one of the most awaited and exciting events of the year for students not just of the school but various other schools in the country too. Schools from around the country are invited to send their students for this fun filed camping event. The camp is exclusively for the students of 8th grade and includes activities ranging from outdoor games, cooking competitions, literary events, adventure sports, art and craft competitions to live performances, campfires and DJ Nights. The event is entirely organized by the students of 11th grade which gives these students an experience of managing and organizing a large scale event.

Arangu
The academic year comes to a close with a spectacular display of fine arts and martial arts by the students of grades 1 to 5.

Sports Day
Every year, students show their mastery of martial arts and sports in a day-long sports celebration, beginning with a March Past, Oath taking, Aerobics and martial arts display. This then develops into an intraschool students sports competition in athletics. A popular sideshow is an athletics competition for teaching and non-teaching staff.

Shastra Samasya
In connection with the National Science Day, the school introduced an annual Science Quiz open to all city schools. Its encourages science talents in children. The C V Raman Memorial Ever Rolling Trophy is awarded to the winning team.

SPICE
Social Participation In Child Education is a supplementary learning program adopted since 1995 wherein the students get a chance to interact with eminent personalities from diverse realms in society.

Other programs
The Orientation program is held at the beginning of the year. The FIT (Faculty Improvement Training) program improves the teaching learning process at the school.

School traditions
Some school traditions include Class Divisions of Upper High School adopting nicknames as identifiers as a part of freshman bonding. For example, during the batch of 2006-07, the four divisions of the 12th Grade were nicknamed, WoOfErS, Evo, BoBy and B2bC. The 12th grade batch of 2009-10 held the tradition by naming themselves, sPuNc, Bix, KuZn, and BlackZ.

See also
List of schools in Ernakulam
Kochi
Central Board of Secondary Education

References

Private schools in Kochi
Educational institutions established in 1990
Boys' schools in India
Boarding schools in Kerala
1990 establishments in Kerala